Howesia is an extinct genus of basal rhynchosaur from early Middle Triassic (early Anisian stage) deposits of Eastern Cape, South Africa. It is known from the holotype SAM 5884, a partial skeleton with palate and partial lower jaws and from two paratypes, SAM 5885 and SAM 5886. It was found in the Burgersdorp Formation of the middle deposits of the Beaufort Group (Karoo Basin) and referred to Subzone B of the Cynognathus Assemblage Zone. It was first named by Robert Broom in 1905 and the type species is Howesia browni, named after Alfred Brown.

References 

Rhynchosaurs
Middle Triassic reptiles of Africa
Anisian life
Fossils of South Africa
Fossil taxa described in 1905
Taxa named by Robert Broom
Prehistoric reptile genera